The NEOGEO Online Collection is a series of classic Neo Geo video games, re-released by SNK Playmore for the PlayStation 2 in Japan. These games allow you to fight against other players over the Internet by way of KDDI's MMBB matching service. Some of these collections have been released in the United States and Europe; however, online connectivity for these collections is not available outside Japan.

Games in the series
The following table lists the games in the collection, both released and announced. Note that some games in the collection were released in different editions: normal, limited, and/or “THE BEST” (a discount version). The dates listed reflect the date the first Neo Geo Online Collection edition was released.

Note: The american and european versions of The King of Fighters: The Orochi Saga includes The King of Fighters '94 and The King of Fighters '98.

References

 SNK Playmore Japan (PlayStation 2 title listing)

2005 video games
Fighting games
Neo Geo
PlayStation 2 games
PlayStation 2-only games
Japan-exclusive video games
SNK Playmore games
SNK game compilations
Video games developed in Japan